Taysan, officially the Municipality of Taysan,  is a 2nd class municipality in the province of Batangas, Philippines. According to the 2020 census, it has a population of 40,146 people.

Geography

According to the Philippine Statistics Authority, the municipality has a land area of  constituting  of the  total area of Batangas.

Taysan is bordered on the north by Rosario and Ibaan, east by a portion of Rosario, west by Batangas City, and south by Lobo.

Barangays
Taysan is politically subdivided into 20 barangays.

Climate

Demographics

In the 2020 census, Taysan had a population of 40,146.

Economy

Gallery

References

External links

[ Philippine Standard Geographic Code]

Municipalities of Batangas